Johanna Emerentia "Jolande" van der Meer (born 18 November 1964 in Delft) is a retired Dutch freestyle swimmer who won two bronze team relay medals at the 1983 and 1985 European Aquatics Championships. She also participated in the 1984 Summer Olympics and finished sixth  in the 400 m and 800 m freestyle events. Between 1983 and 1984 she set four national records in the 800 m and 1500 m freestyle.

References

1964 births
Living people
Dutch female freestyle swimmers
Olympic swimmers of the Netherlands
Swimmers at the 1984 Summer Olympics
Sportspeople from Delft
European Aquatics Championships medalists in swimming
20th-century Dutch women